Prothalotia flindersi, common name the Flinders top shell, is a species of sea snail, a marine gastropod mollusk in the family Trochidae, the top snails.

Description
The height of the shell attains 16 mm, its diameter 13 mm. The rather thick, very narrowly perforate shell has a conical shape. It contains 7 to 8 planulate whorls. The first one is eroded, the succeeding are whitish-ashen, radiated with narrow, close and flexuose blackish and violaceous lines. They are spirally cingulate, with 6 lirae on penultimate whorl. The body whorl is subangular, a little depressed above, dilated in the middle. The base of the shell is convex and ornamented with about 8 lirae. The aperture is rhomboidal. The lip is simple. The truncate columella is truncate below.

Distribution
This marine species is endemic to Australia and occurs off South Australia and Western Australia.

References

 Thiele, J. 1930. Gastropoda und Bivalvia. pp. 561–596 in Michaelsen, W. & Hartmayer, R. (eds). Die Fauna Südwest-Australiens. Jena : Gustav Fischer Vol. 5.
 Cotton, B.C. 1959. South Australian Mollusca. Archaeogastropoda. Handbook of the Flora and Fauna of South Australia. Adelaide : South Australian Government Printer 449 pp

External links
 To World Register of Marine Species
 Fischer P. 1878. Diagnoses trochorum novorum. Journal de Conchyliologie, 26: 62-67

flindersi
Gastropods described in 1878